Princess Victoria of Saxe-Coburg and Gotha (Victoria Franziska Antonia Juliane Luise); 14 February 1822 – 10 November 1857) was the daughter of Ferdinand, Prince of Saxe-Coburg and Gotha-Koháry and Princess Maria Antonia Koháry de Csábrág et Szitnya. Her father was the second son of Francis, Duke of Saxe-Coburg-Saalfeld and Countess Augusta Reuss of Ebersdorf. Through her father she was a first cousin to Queen Victoria as Queen Victoria's  mother was her aunt.

Biography

Born to Ferdinand, Prince of Saxe-Coburg and Gotha-Koháry and Princess Maria Antonia Koháry de Csábrág et Szitnya. Her mother was the daughter and heiress of Ferenc József, Prince Koháry de Csábrág et Szitnya. When Antonia's father died in 1826, she inherited his estates in Slovakia and Hungary. Her elder brother was King Ferdinand II of Portugal and first cousins included British Queen Victoria, her husband Prince Albert of Saxe-Coburg and Gotha as well as Belgian King Leopold II and his sister, Empress Carlota of Mexico.

On 27 April 1840, at the Château de Saint-Cloud, she married Louis d'Orléans, known since birth as the Duke of Nemours, second son of King Louis Philippe of France. After the Revolution of 1848 in France, the royal family went into exile and settled in England.

The Duke and Duchess of Nemours had four children, all of them having issue except the last, Blanche, who never married. Victoria was outlived by her husband, who died in 1896. She died almost two weeks after giving birth to Blanche at Claremont and was buried at the Chapel of Saint Charles Borromeo in Weybridge.  Her remains were transferred to the Royal Chapel of Dreux, the traditional burial place of the House of Orléans, in 1979.

Issue
 Louis Philippe Marie Ferdinand Gaston d'Orléans, Count of Eu (28 April 1842 – 28 August 1922), who married Isabella, eldest daughter and heiress of Dom Pedro II of Brazil;
 Ferdinand Philippe Marie d'Orléans, Duke of Alençon (12 July 1844 – 29 June 1910), who married Duchess Sophie Charlotte in Bavaria (1847–1897), sister of Elisabeth, Empress of Austria, and who had been for a time engaged to Ludwig II of Bavaria;
 Marguerite Adélaïde Marie d'Orléans (1846–1893), who married Prince Ladislaus Czartoryski;
 Blanche Marie Amelie Caroline Louise Victoire d'Orléans (28 October 1857 – 4 February 1932).

Honours
 : Dame of the Order of Queen Saint Isabel, 22 July 1839

Ancestry

References

External links
 

1822 births
1857 deaths
Nobility from Vienna
Victoria
Victoria
Victoria
Burials at the Chapelle royale de Dreux
Victoria
Dames of the Order of Saint Isabel
Deaths in childbirth
Royal reburials